Kilawala Mohra is a union council in the Islamabad Capital Territory of Pakistan. It is located at 33° 24' 10N 73° 25' 25E with an altitude of 509 metres (1673 feet).

References 

Union councils of Islamabad Capital Territory